University of Tehran’s International Campus - Kish Island is located on Kish Island. The official language of the Kish International Campus is English and all courses are offered in English.

Conferences
The campus hosted the 14/6/2012 South Asian Teaching Session on International Humanitarian Law organized by the International Committee of the Red Cross, attended by seventy experts from eleven Asian countries.

Departments

 Engineering
 Fine Arts
 Law
 Management
 English
 Physical Education and Sports Sciences
 Economics
 Science and Biotechnology

Degree programs 
UT Kish International Campus offers the following degree programs:

 Bachelor of Arts/Bachelor of Sciences: Architecture / Industrial Design / Painting / Urbanism / Computer Engineering / Industrial Engineering / Electrical Engineering / Financial Management/ Accounting / Industrial Management / Law

 Master of Arts/Master of Sciences: Financial Management/ MBA (Marketing/ Finance/ Human Resources/ Technology/Strategy)/ Sports Science and Physical Education ( Motor Behavior/ Corrective Exercise and Sports Injuries / Sports Management / Sports Physiology) / Economic Sciences / Accounting/ Industrial Management/ Tourism Management/ Geography (Tourism Planning)/ Graphics (Visual Communication) / Architecture/ Industrial Design / Visual Arts/ Painting / Music Composing / Urban Planning/ Urban Design/ Industrial Engineering/ Computer Engineering- software/ Information Technology/ Information Security/ Polymer Engineering/ Electrical Engineering/ Chemical Engineering- Hydrocarbon Reservoirs/ Chemical Engineering/ Mechatronics / Cell and Molecular Sciences ( Biology) / Persian Literature/ English Literature/ TEFL/ International Law/ Public Law/ Private Law/ Environmental Design.

 PhD: TEFL/ English Literature/ Persian Literature/ International Law/ Public Law/ Sports Sciences and Physical Education (Motor Learning and Development / Corrective Exercise and Sports Injuries / Sports Management)/ Accounting / Management (Finance/ Research in Operation /Media/ Production & Operations/ Business)

Cancer research
Advanced studies conducted in Effect of Combination Exercise Training on Metabolic Syndrome Parameters in Postmenopausal Women with Breast Cancer were conducted at the UT's Kish International Campus have been registered with the United States Library of Medicine, National Institutes of Health.

References

Educational institutions established in 1934
Education in Hormozgan Province
Buildings and structures in Hormozgan Province
1934 establishments in Iran